Anne Spielberg (born December 25, 1949) is an American screenwriter and producer. The co-producer and co-writer of the screenplay for the 1988 movie Big, she is also the younger sister of film director Steven Spielberg.

Formative years
Born on December 25, 1949 in Philadelphia, Pennsylvania, Anne Spielberg is a daughter of the late Arnold Spielberg, a native of Cincinnati, Ohio, and Leah (Posner) Spielberg, and  also the sister of filmmaker Steven Spielberg, Nancy Spielberg and Sue Spielberg.

Career
After working for her brother's production company, Amblin Entertainment, Spielberg and her neighbor Gary Ross co-wrote the movie Big in 1988, for which she was nominated for an Academy Award for Best Original Screenplay. She was also a co-producer on the film, along with noted television and film producer James L. Brooks. Spielberg was an uncredited co-writer of the film Small Soldiers (1998); it was inspired by the combination of Child's Play (1988) and Toy Story (1995).

In popular culture
Her life, and the lives of her siblings, were depicted in the 2022 film, The Fabelmans.

References

External links
 

1949 births
20th-century American screenwriters
Living people
American women screenwriters
Family of Steven Spielberg
Writers from Philadelphia